In combinatorial mathematics, specifically in combinatorial design theory and combinatorial matrix theory the Williamson conjecture is that Williamson matrices of order  exist for all positive integers .

where  is the identity matrix of order .

is an Hadamard matrix of order .
It was once considered likely that Williamson matrices exist for all orders 
and that the structure of Williamson matrices could provide a route to proving the Hadamard conjecture that Hadamard matrices exist for all orders .
However, in 1993 the Williamson conjecture was shown to be false via an exhaustive computer search by Dragomir Ž. Ðoković, who showed that Williamson matrices do not exist in order .  In 2008, the counterexamples 47, 53, and 59 were additionally discovered.

References 

Combinatorial design
Disproved conjectures